Loten Namling is an Indian-born singer, musician artist, entertainer and cartoonist currently living in Switzerland. He is working on his project, "Blues", in which he explores paths linking the songs to culture.

The 14th Dalai Lama once called Loten "a singer with a voice."

Based in Switzerland, the artist has travelled worldwide with his lute, singing the songs of the 2nd Dalai Lama, as well as other traditional songs, and his own songs. From Kalmykia to Korea to Wales, Namling has performed worldwide, telling stories about his life, connecting songs of the past to the reality of the present, and inviting his audience on a journey through the landscape of spirituality.

Activism 
On 13 May 2013, Namling started what he called A Journey for Freedom – One Man, One Path. He walked from the Swiss capital of Bern to Geneva, dragging a black coffin around to attract attention.  Arriving on 8 July, he performed with some 13 more musicians, amongst them renowned Swiss band The Young Gods whose singer Franz Treichler had strongly supported the artist's action and had organized the performance on Place des Nations, in front of Geneva UN headquarters. It inspired Tibetan Warrior, a documentary film directed by Dodo Hunziker and produced by Urs Schnell, about the quest of Loten Namling from Europe to India where he met with politicians, experts and young radicalists before requesting the Dalai Lama his advice.

In October 2013, Namling was given the Free Spirit Award in McLeod Ganj for this "Journey of freedom" march.

Discography
 Songs of Narcissism (1999)
 Black Crane (2001)

References

External links

song, by Namling
Rapper Curse feat. Loten Namling, 2012-05-26
Spirit Award 2012: Loten Namling
Loten Namling at Blogspot

Living people
Indian male musicians
20th-century Swiss musicians
Tibetan cartoonists
Tibetan caricaturists
Tibetan musicians
21st-century Swiss musicians
20th-century Indian musicians
21st-century Indian musicians
20th-century male musicians
21st-century male musicians
Year of birth missing (living people)